Cleve Airport  is an airport located  east of Cleve, South Australia.

See also
 List of airports in South Australia

References

External links
Cleve Airport at the District Council of Cleve

Airports in South Australia
Eyre Peninsula